Leather and Lace is a duet album by Waylon Jennings and Jessi Colter, released on RCA Records in 1981.

Background
Jennings and Colter met and married in 1969.  As Jennings recalled in the audio version of his autobiography Waylon, "I went through my marriages like Grant went through Richmond.  I finally gave up.  I said, 'Hell, I ain't ever gonna be able to be married.'  And when I thought it was just about all over, when I quit looking, that's when I found the right one."  In a 1973 article with Chet Flippo of Rolling Stone, Jennings confessed, "When I met Jessie, I was pretty well at my lowest point. I weighed 138 pounds and I was bent on self-destruction. Wallerin' in self-pity was the biggest part of it, stayin' depressed all the time and stoned. Jess was the best thing that ever happened to me."  Jennings and Colter recorded several duets, the most successful being "Suspicious Minds," which reached #25 on the country singles chart in 1970; it was re-released when it appeared on Wanted! The Outlaws in 1976 and rose all the way to #2.  Colter often sang background vocals on Jennings' albums and scored her own smash hit with "I'm Not Lisa" in 1975.  In May 1979, Jessi gave birth to the couple's only child, Waylon Albright Jennings (better known as Shooter Jennings) but, by 1981, Waylon was severely addicted to cocaine and nearly broke, despite coming off one of the most successful periods of critical and commercial success that country music had ever seen.  It was in this state that the couple recorded their first LP together.

Recording and composition
Although Jennings was, at the time of the album's release, most famous for his involvement with the outlaw country movement, Leather and Lace abandons the outlaw image in favor of calmer selections consisting partly of love songs.  The medley of "The Wild Side of Life"/"It Wasn't God Who Made Honky Tonk Angels" (originally 1952 hits for Hank Thompson and Kitty Wells respectively) was released rather successfully as a single, reaching #10 on the country charts. Waylon sings solo vocals on "What's Happened to Blue Eyes", a song Jessi wrote and originally recorded on her 1975 album, I'm Jessi Colter. The Colter composition "Storms Never Last" had appeared on Jennings' previous 1980 album, Music Man, and is presented here as a duet for the first time.  "You Never Can Tell (C'est la Vie)" is a well-known Chuck Berry song (with a country version having charted a few years prior by Emmylou Harris).  "I Ain't the One" is a reprise of an earlier duet that had been the B-side to their 1970 duet cover "Suspicious Minds".  The album closes with Jennings' solo vocals on the song, "You're Not My Same Sweet Baby", written and originally recorded by one of his favorite songwriters, Mickey Newbury.

Stevie Nicks had been commissioned by Jennings to write a single for this album which would have been the title cut, although the song did not appear on the album. Nicks went on to record the song as a duet with Don Henley on her 1981 album, Bella Donna, and it would become a top-ten U.S. hit later that year.  Jennings had recorded the Nicks composition "Gold Dust Woman" for his 1978 duet album with Willie Nelson entitled Waylon and Willie.

Reception
Leather and Lace peaked at #11 on Billboards country albums chart.  AllMusic: "The outlaw movement had run its course by the time Leather and Lace was made, so Colter and Jennings were free to make their overdue duet album without having to prop up that particular facade. The result is an enjoyable half-hour of husband-and-wife music, comfortable as an old shoe."

Track listing
"You Never Can Tell (C'est la Vie)" (Chuck Berry)
"Rainy Seasons" (Colter, Basil McDavid)
"I'll Be Alright" (Jennings, Jerry Bridges, Michael Lawley)
"The Wild Side of Life"/"It Wasn't God Who Made Honky Tonk Angels" (William Warren, Arlie A. Carter, J. D. "Jay" Miller)
"Pastels & Harmony" (Gordon Payne, Bee Spears)
"I Believe You Can" (Colter, Basil McDavid)
"What's Happened to Blue Eyes" (Colter)
"Storms Never Last" (Colter) 	
"I Ain't the One" (Miriam Eddy aka Jessi Colter)
"You're Not My Same Sweet Baby" (Mickey Newbury)

Personnel
Charlie McCoy
Richie Albright
Ralph Mooney
Barney Robertson
Gordon Payne
Jessi Colter
Waylon Jennings
Sonny Curtis
Jerry Bridges
Bucky Wilkin
Ken Buttrey
Norbert Putnam
Pete Wade
Carter Robertson

Chart performance

References

Waylon Jennings albums
Jessi Colter albums
1981 albums
RCA Records albums
Vocal duet albums